Grant McKee (born September 14, 1940) is a Canadian football player who played for the Hamilton Tiger-Cats, Edmonton Eskimos and Toronto Argonauts. He won the Grey Cup with the Tiger-Cats in 1963. He played college football at the University of Michigan.

References

1940 births
Living people
Edmonton Elks players
Hamilton Tiger-Cats players
Toronto Argonauts players